The 2012–13 Illinois Fighting Illini men's basketball team represented the University of Illinois at Urbana–Champaign in the 2012–13 NCAA Division I men's basketball season. Led by first year head coach John Groce, the Illini played their home games at Assembly Hall and were members of the Big Ten Conference.

Pre-season

2012 additions

Incoming transfers

Preferred Walk-On

Departures

Roster

Schedule

|-
!colspan=12 style="background:#DF4E38; color:white;"| Exhibition
|-
	
|-

|-
!colspan=12 style="background:#DF4E38; color:white;"| Non-Conference regular season
|-
	
|-
	
|-
	
|-
	
|-
	
|-
	
|-
	
|-
	
|-
	
|-
	
|-
	
|-

|-
!colspan=9 style="background:#DF4E38; color:#FFFFFF;"|Big Ten regular season
|-	
	
|-
	
|-
	
|-
	
|-
	
|-
	
|-
	
|-
	
|-
	
|-
	
|-
	
|-
	
|-
	
|-
	
|-
	
|-

|-

	
|-
!colspan=9 style="text-align: center; background:#DF4E38"|Big Ten tournament

|-
!colspan=9 style="text-align: center; background:#DF4E38"|NCAA tournament

|-

National rankings

Season Statistics

References

Illinois
Illinois Fighting Illini men's basketball seasons
Illinois
Illinois Fighting Illini men's basketball team
Illinois Fighting Illini men's basketball team